Jes or JES may refer to:


People 
 Jes (musician), American singer and songwriter
 Jes Bertelsen, Danish spiritual teacher and author
 Jes Bundsen (1766–1829), Danish painter and etcher
 Jes Gordon (born 1969), American event producer
 Jes Høgh (born 1966), Danish footballer
 Jes Holtsø (born 1956), Danish actor
 Jes Macallan (born 1982), American actress
 Jes Psaila (born 1964), Maltese guitarist
 Jes Staley (born 1956), American banker

Other uses 
 Jes Air, a former Bulgarian airline

Acronyms
 Job Entry Subsystem 1 (JES1), a component of the VS1 operating system
 Job Entry Subsystem 2/3, (JES2, JES3) a component of the MVS operating systems
 Junulara Esperanto-Semajno ("Esperanto Youth Week"), an annual Esperanto youth meeting 
 Producciones JES, a Colombian TV production company 
 Java Enterprise System, a component of the Sun Java System

See also
 Jess (disambiguation)